A consecutive case series is a clinical study that includes all eligible patients identified by the researchers during the study registration period. The patients are treated in the order in which they are identified. This type of study usually does not have a control group.

For example, in Sugrue, et al. (2016), a consecutive case series design was used to determine trends in hand surgery research.

References

External links 
 Consecutive case series entry in the public domain NCI Dictionary of Cancer Terms

Clinical research
Design of experiments